Gemmula kaiparaensis is an extinct species of sea snail, a marine gastropod mollusk in the family Turridae, the turrids.

Description

Distribution
Fossils of this marine species have been found in New Zealand.

References

 Marshall, P. (1918). The Tertiary molluscan fauna of Pakaurangi Point, Kaipara Harbour. Transactions of the New Zealand Institute. 50: 263-278
 Maxwell, P.A. (2009). Cenozoic Mollusca. pp 232–254 in Gordon, D.P. (ed.) New Zealand inventory of biodiversity. Volume one. Kingdom Animalia: Radiata, Lophotrochozoa, Deuterostomia. Canterbury University Press, Christchurch

kaiparaensis
Gastropods described in 1918
Gastropods of New Zealand